

Amphilochus (Ancient Greek: Ἀμφίλοχος Amphílokhos) was a figure in Greek mythology.

Family 
According to a story ascribed to a lost work by Euripides by the Bibliotheca, this Amphilochus was the son of Alcmaeon, one of the Epigoni, and Manto, the daughter of the Theban seer Teiresias. He was the nephew of a different Amphilochus, and the brother of Tisiphone.

Mythology 
In Euripides's lost play Alcmaeon in Corinth, Manto is sent to Delphi and then to Caria. Alcmaeon entrusts young Amphilochus and his sister Tisiphone to king Creon of Corinth, but Creon's queen sells the girl into slavery. Alcmaeon eventually discovers this and recovers both children.

According to Apollodorus, Amphilochus founded Amphilochian Argos, although this is usually attributed to his uncle.

Notes

References

Apollodorus, The Library with an English Translation by Sir James George Frazer, F.B.A., F.R.S. in 2 Volumes, Cambridge, MA, Harvard University Press; London, William Heinemann Ltd. 1921. ISBN 0-674-99135-4. Online version at the Perseus Digital Library. Greek text available from the same website.
Gantz, Timothy, Early Greek Myth: A Guide to Literary and Artistic Sources, Johns Hopkins University Press, 1996, Two volumes:  (Vol. 1),  (Vol. 2).
Thucydides, The Peloponnesian War. London, J. M. Dent; New York, E. P. Dutton. 1910. Online version at the Perseus Digital Library. Greek text available from the same website.

Characters in Greek mythology
Mythology of Argos